Los silencios is a 2018 drama film directed by Beatriz Seigner. It was selected to screen in the Directors' Fortnight section at the 2018 Cannes Film Festival. At the 20th Havana Film Festival New York, protagonist Marleyda Soto was awarded the Havana Star Prize for Best Actress for her role in the film.

Cast
 Marleyda Soto
 Enrique Díaz
 Adolfo Savinino
 Maria Paula Tabares Peña

References

External links
 

2018 films
2018 drama films
2010s Portuguese-language films
2010s Spanish-language films
Brazilian drama films
2018 multilingual films
Brazilian multilingual films